Sultan Masrahi (born 31 May 1987) is a Saudi Arabian professional footballer who plays as a center back for Al-Noor.

References

External links
 

Living people
1987 births
Association football defenders
Saudi Arabian footballers
Al-Qadsiah FC players
Al-Nahda Club (Saudi Arabia) players
Al Batin FC players
Damac FC players
Khaleej FC players
Al-Thoqbah Club players
Al Safa FC players
Al-Noor FC players
Place of birth missing (living people)
Saudi First Division League players
Saudi Professional League players
Saudi Second Division players
Saudi Third Division players